Otabek Mahkamov (born September 5, 1984) is an Uzbek film actor, lawyer, blogger, and Internet personality. Mahkamov is mostly known for his supporting roles in several Uzbek films. The actor has been in a number of notable films where he played mostly negative characters. He has also appeared in music videos of several Uzbek singers, most notably in Ozodbek Nazarbekov's "Meni kuchliroq sev".

Mahkamov's first studio movie appearance was in the 2010 film Boʻrilar 3: Oxirgi qarz (Wolves 3: The Final Debt). In the movie, he played the role of a criminal investigator. He achieved further notability in Uzbekistan after his role as an investigator in the 2011 film Majruh (Insane). Other notable films in which Mahkamov has appeared include Men yulduzman (I'm a Star) (2012), Jodugar (The Witch) (2012), Yondiradi, kuydiradi (My Love, My Pain) (2012), and Fotima (Fotima) (2013). In late 2016, Mahkamov moved to New York City and started uploading video blogs to YouTube. 

In 2015, it became known that Mahkamov had made contradictory and false claims about his birthplace, academic qualifications, and skills. The first article that brought to light the contradictions in Mahkamov's claims was published by the Osh-based literature website Ijodkor. A month later the Uzbek entertainment website Sayyod published a short article which stated that Mahkamov had provided Uzbek journalists with false information about his background. The author fell short of directly accusing Mahkamov, but promised to publish a more detailed account of the matter. In an interview with the Uzbek tabloid Bekajon, Mahkamov denied the accusations. However, he refused to comment on the contradictions in his claims, only stating "Those rumors you're talking about are unfounded".

Life
Otabek Mahkamov was born on September 5, 1984, in either Fergana or Tashkent. In some of his interviews with Uzbek publications, Mahkamov has claimed to have been born in Tashkent. In others, he has claimed to have been born in Ferghana. His father, Abduvahob Sattorovich, died when he was young. His mother, Raʼno Erkinovna, died in 2009.

Career
According to Uzbek tabloids, Mahkamov has a degree in law and worked as a lawyer. The tabloids also claim that he currently teaches at the National Association of Accountants and Auditors of Uzbekistan.

Mahkamov's first studio movie appearance was in the 2010 film Boʻrilar 3: Oxirgi qarz. He achieved further notability in Uzbekistan after his role as an investigator in the 2011 film Majruh. Other notable films in which Mahkamov has appeared include Men yulduzman (I'm a Star) (2012), Jodugar (The Witch) (2012), Yondiradi-kuydiradi (My Love, My Pain) (2012), and Fotima (Fotima) (2013).

Apart from his roles in feature films, Mahkamov has also appeared in music videos of several Uzbek singers, most notably in Ozodbek Nazarbekov's "Meni kuchliroq sev".

Mahkamov has also published his interviews with international celebrities in Uzbek tabloids and magazines. So far he has published his interviews with Cary-Hiroyuki Tagawa, Frédéric Diefenthal, Armand Assante, Ennio Morricone, and Mithun Chakraborty.

Criticism
In 2015, it emerged that Mahkamov had made contradictory and false claims about his birthplace, academic qualifications, and skills. These contradictions came to light after Mahkamov personally contacted one of the administrators of the Uzbek Wikipedia requesting help in creating an entry about himself. The first article that gave a detailed account of the contradictions in Mahkamov's claims was published by the Osh-based literature website Ijodkor. On March 8, 2015, the Uzbek entertainment website Sayyod published a short article which stated that Mahkamov had provided Uzbek journalists with false information about his background. The author fell short of directly accusing Mahkamov, but promised to publish a more detailed account of the matter.

Mahkamov's claims about his academic qualifications
According to Uzbek media, Mahkamov has graduated from "Central European Law University" located in Budapest. In some of his interviews, Mahkamov has referred to the same university as "Central European Law University under the UN". Another source claims that Mahkamov graduated from the "European Law Enforcement Academy" with a PhD in international private law. In reality, no such university exists in Budapest or elsewhere. When Mahkamov was asked whether he was possibly referring to Central European University, he responded by saying "That must be it then". However, Central European University denied anyone of that name had studied there.

In some of his interviews, Mahkamov has claimed to have obtained a PhD from the nonexistent "Central European Law University". In another interview, he claimed to have received his PhD in 2005. Given that Mahkamov was only 21 at the time and it had been only four years since his graduation from high school, this claim was shown to be a lie.

In other occasions Mahkamov has claimed to have simply interned at the "European university". In yet another interview, he claimed to have received his BA from the "Central European Legal University" and his MA in the US. However, he did not specify exactly when or where he had received his MA.

Mahkamov's claims about his interpretation skills
Mahkamov has consistently claimed that he speaks English highly fluently and has native proficiency. However, his claims have been questioned. Specifically, he was shown to have done a poor job of interpreting and speaking in the films Yondiradi, kuydiradi (My Love, My Pain) and Kelgindi kelin 2: Anjancha muhabbat (The Alien Bride 2: Love, Andijan Style. In one of his interviews, Mahkamov stated that he always dubs his own voice while speaking in English.

Mahkamov's response to criticism
In an interview with the Uzbek tabloid Bekajon, Mahkamov denied the accusations. However, he refused to comment on the contradictions in his claims. He stated that "Those rumors you're talking about are unfounded. I'm sorry, but when writing an article about somebody, shouldn't you be neutral instead of insulting them? The fans haven't insulted me or said negative words [about me]. This means people aren't following anyone. Most importantly, it is only the tree loaded with fruit that the people throw stones at. So, since people are throwing stones at me, I must be a fruit-bearing tree."

Filmography

References

External links 

 Otabek Mahkamov at Kinopoisk.ru 
 The Great Traveler Otabek Mahkamov, Celebrities, August 28, 2012 

21st-century Uzbekistani male actors
1984 births
Uzbeks
Living people
People from Fergana
Uzbekistani lawyers
Uzbekistani male film actors